Voysil Peak is the peak rising to 2743 m in Maglenik Heights, north-central Sentinel Range in Ellsworth Mountains, Antarctica.  It is surmounting Kopsis Glacier tributaries to the north and east, and upper Ellen Glacier to the southwest.

The peak is named after the settlement of Voysil in Southern Bulgaria.

Location
US mapping in 1961, updated in 1988.

Maps
 Vinson Massif.  Scale 1:250 000 topographic map.  Reston, Virginia: US Geological Survey, 1988.
 Antarctic Digital Database (ADD). Scale 1:250000 topographic map of Antarctica. Scientific Committee on Antarctic Research (SCAR). Since 1993, regularly updated.

Notes

References
 Voysil Peak. SCAR Composite Antarctic Gazetteer.
 Bulgarian Antarctic Gazetteer. Antarctic Place-names Commission. (details in Bulgarian, basic data in English)

External links
 Voysil Peak. Copernix satellite image

Ellsworth Mountains
Mountains of Ellsworth Land
Bulgaria and the Antarctic